Josh Morris may refer to:

 Josh Morris (footballer, born 1991), English footballer
 Josh Morris (Australian footballer) (born 2001), Australian rules footballer
 Josh Morris (politician) (born 1982),  Australian politician
 Josh Morris (rugby league) (born 1986), Australian rugby league footballer